Bradley is a village and civil parish in Derbyshire just east of Ashbourne. The population of the civil parish taken at the 2011 Census was 313.  Other neighbouring parishes include Hulland and Yeldersley.

History
Bradley was mentioned in the Domesday book of 1086 as belonging to Henry de Ferrers, having previously been in the possession of "Aelfric of Bradbourne" and "Leofwin".
The village is assessed as being worth twenty shillings (a fall, having been valued as worth £2 in 1066), and having a taxable value of 1 geld unit. The village is recorded as having 17 households, 6 of which were smallholdings.

In 1891 Kelly described the village as "an agricultural parish and picturesque but scattered village" of 2,374 acres. The soil is described as "chiefly gravel and clay", with the main crops grown being hay, wheat, barley, oats and turnips. The population is recorded as 227 and the rateable value of the village given as £2,945.

Village landmarks

All Saints' Church
The village's parish church is dedicated to All Saints. Primarily constructed in the late 14th century, but incorporating some earlier work, it has an unusual layout with an aisleless nave and chancel, and no tower. In 1891 the church was described as "an edifice in the Decorated style of the early 14th century, consists of a small chancel and nave under a single roof, south porch and a wooden turret at the west end containing 3 bells, two of which date from 1722, the tenor being undated".
The 18th century wooden bell-turret has been removed and one of the bells is attached to the rear wall. The church was substantially renovated in the 19th century. The church contains several graves and monuments belonging to members of the Kniveton, Byrom and Meynell families, who had formerly resided at Bradley Hall opposite the church.

Bradley Hall
The original Bradley Hall was sold by Sir Andrew Kniverton who was bankrupted by the English Civil War. The Old Bradley Hall was demolished by Hugo Meynell in the late 18th century, who built the Hall we currently see. What is known as "Bradley Hall" today was originally built to be part of a stable-block for a new Hall which was never built. The stable block was later converted to serve as the residence. Additions were made to the Hall in both the 19th and 20th centuries; it is currently protected as Grade II Listed. The hall was recently listed up for sale with a guide price of £2,900,000.

Hole-in-the-Wall
Hole-in-the-Wall is a pair of brick tenements dated 1750–51, with a central road arch, on the outskirts of the main village. It was formally the entrance gate to the park.

Primary school
The Church of England primary school was founded in 1873.

Notable residents
 Thomas Bancroft, a 17th-century poet from Swarkestone, retired here.

The following lines are by Sir Aston Cockayne and begin a commendation of Bancroft's poem:
From your  abode in Bradley town,
Welcome, my friend, abroad to fair renown.
Nova Atlantis and Eutopia you
Again expose unto the publique view

 Major Ernest Clowes, DSO, who served in the second Anglo-Boer War with the Life Guards, and in the Great War.  Succeeded by his son John Ernest Clowes who served with the Special Operations Executive (SOE) during World War Two in Greece (Force 133) and Burma (Force 136).

See also
Listed buildings in Bradley, Derbyshire

References

Civil parishes in Derbyshire
Villages in Derbyshire
Towns and villages of the Peak District
Derbyshire Dales